Please Sir! is a British television sitcom created by John Esmonde and Bob Larbey and featuring actors John Alderton, Deryck Guyler, Penny Spencer, Joan Sanderson, Noel Howlett, Erik Chitty and Richard Davies. Produced by London Weekend Television for ITV, the series ran for 55 episodes between 1968 and 1972.

The theme tune "School's Out" was by Sam Fonteyn.

The title derives from the then-standard request phrase used in Britain when they wish to interrupt the teacher with a question.

Although the series is based around a class of 16-year-old pupils, all of the actors in these roles were in fact in their early 20s and looked distinctly too old for the setting.

Synopsis
The programme was set in the fictional Fenn Street Secondary Modern School and starred John Alderton as Bernard Hedges, a young teacher fresh out of training college. The supporting cast included Deryck Guyler, Joan Sanderson and Richard Davies. Character actors and actresses formed the guest cast, including Mollie Sugden as a parent of one of the pupils, Barbara Mitchell as Frankie Abbott's mother, and Ann Lancaster as Mrs Pearce in a pair of 1968 episodes.

There were three basic locations for the scenarios: Hedges' classroom, the staffroom and the playground/outer area.

The class nickname for Hedges is "Privet" deriving from privet hedges.

Bernard Hedges and the 5C pupils were replaced by a new teacher and pupils for the final series in 1971–72, while the original pupils continued in a spin-off series, The Fenn Street Gang, which ran for 47 episodes between 1971 and 1973. This was followed by Bowler (1973), following crime boss Stanley Bowler, played by George Baker for 13 episodes.

As with many situation comedies of this era, a film version was developed, released in 1971. This was set in an outdoor pursuit centre, but starred most of the TV cast.

Cast

Staff
John Alderton as Mr Bernard Hedges (1968-1971) (36 episodes)
Deryck Guyler as Mr Norman Potter, the caretaker (55 episodes)
Noel Howlett as Mr Cromwell, the headmaster (55 episodes)
Joan Sanderson as Miss Doris Ewell, the senior mistress (55 episodes)
Richard Davies as Mr Price, the chemistry teacher (55 episodes)
Erik Chitty as Mr Smith (55 episodes)
Bernard Holley as Mr Hurst (1971-1972) (8 episodes)
Vivienne Martin as Miss Petting (1971-1972) (8 episodes)
Richard Warwick as Mr David Ffitchett-Brown (1971) (7 episodes)
Lindsay Campbell as Mr Sibley (1970-1972) (5 episodes)
Glynn Edwards as Mr Dix (1971) (2 episodes)
Arnold Peters as School Governor (1970-1972) (3 episodes)
 Geoffrey Hughes as odd job man (series 2)

Pupils

1968–1971
Liz Gebhardt as Maureen Bullock (37 episodes)
Peter Cleall as Eric Duffy (36 episodes)
David Barry as Frankie Abbott (35 episodes)
Peter Denyer as Dennis Dunstable (35 episodes)
Penny Spencer as Sharon Eversleigh (1968-1970) (34 episodes)
Carol Hawkins as Sharon Eversleigh (1971) (1 episode), Hawkins also played the role in the 1971 film spin-off and the sequel series The Fenn Street Gang.
Malcolm McFee as Peter Craven (1968-1970) (34 episodes)
Leon Vitali as Peter Craven (1971) (1 episode)

1971–1972
Charles Bolton as Godber (13 episodes)
Shirley Cheriton as Pat (1971) (3 episodes)
Rosemary Faith as Daisy (12 episodes)
Brinsley Forde as Herman (1971) (2 episodes)
Billy Hamon as Des  (12 episodes)
David Howe as Colin Lovelace (1970-1971) (6 episodes)
Linda Joliff as Elizabeth (1971) (2 episodes)
Barry McCarthy as Terry Stringer (12 episodes)
Drina Pavlovic as Celia (12 episodes)
Roderick Smith as Philip Larch (1971) (3 episodes)

Other
Jill Kerman as Penny Hedges (Nee Wheeler) (1968-1972) (36 episodes)
Ann Lancaster as Mrs Pearce (1968) (2 episodes)
Barbara Mitchell as Mrs Abbott (1969-70) (2 episodes)
Susan Richards as Madge Smith (2 episodes)

Episodes
NOTE: All of these episode descriptions have been taken from the DVD sleeves of the Please Sir DVDs, released by Network (In Australia, Series One and Two are available as one set of DVDs, Series Three (along with the 1971 Please Sir movie) as another).

Note: The first series was in an experimental 40-minute format (to fit in a 45-minute slot). Repeats of some first series episodes were later edited down into the standard 25-minute (half hour) runtime, losing a considerable amount of footage (and on occasion, plot detail) as a result. The remaining episodes were in the traditional 25-minute format (to fit in a 30-minute slot)

The transmission dates and times reflect the listings for the London ITV region. Listings for the alternative ITV regions are not indicated.

Series One
This series was recorded and transmitted in black and white on the VHF 405-line TV system.

Series Two
All of these episodes were made in colour, although all the episodes up to The Generation Gap were transmitted in monochrome, as ITV began colour transmission on Saturday 15 November 1969. All were shown in colour in a repeat run, seen in some ITV regions in early 1970.

Series Three
The final three episodes of this series were affected by the ITV Colour Strike, which affected all ITV programmes recorded between November 1970 and March 1971. As a result of this industrial action, these affected episodes were recorded and transmitted in black and white.

Series Four
Unlike the previous series, episodes were initially broadcast on a Saturday. However, there was a week's break in transmission between Episode 14 (Old Fennians Day) and Episode 15 (What Are You Incinerating). When it returned it was broadcast in a Sunday night slot. This was only in London. In the other ITV regions, it continued to be broadcast on Saturdays at 6:30pm, so the rest of the nation saw the last 7 episodes of this series one day before Londoners saw them.

Characters

Staff

Mr Bernard Hedges (Portrayed by John Alderton). A teacher fresh out of training. He was allocated Class 5C, the most unruly form in the 
school, at the beginning of term. At first relations were frosty between Bernard and Class 5C, but gradually Bernard gained the respect 
of his class and the rest of the staff. As the series progressed, he is shown to be a caring and very fair teacher and would always defend 
his form, regardless of how much evidence is put towards them.

In the movie, he met air stewardess Penny Wheeler. After misinterpreting a 'few white lies' made by a pupil accidentally left behind, Penny   
began to take shine to Bernard. After a period of dating, Bernard attempted to propose to Penny but she already said yes before he could complete his sentence and they got engaged and later married.

Shortly after Bernard got married, a new term started and he was allocated Class 4C. However, it was not quite the same as 5C. He later resigned and left at the end of Series 4 episode 2 to take a course in Sociology at the University of London..

Mr Norman Potter (Portrayed by Deryck Guyler). The pedantic and officious school caretaker. His speech is peppered with malapropisms. He claimed to have been a Desert Rat and constantly complains about the unruly behaviour of Hedges' class 5C. He is fiercely loyal (to the point of sycophancy) to the headmaster but a thorn in the side of the rest of the staff. His various comeuppances provide much of the ongoing humour of the sitcom. He often talks of his wife Ruby but she is never seen on-screen.

Mr Maurice Cromwell (Portrayed by Noel Howlett). The Headteacher - nicknamed "Oliver" - is a well-meaning, idealistic and liberal figure. He is also utterly ineffectual. He is admired and consistently flattered by his deputy Miss Ewell and caretaker Potter but regarded more ambivalently by Hedges and Price. He is the only person in the school who is unable to see through Potter's trouble-making and incompetence and sometimes ends up in childish arguments with the otherwise mild-mannered Mr Smith. Later in the Series his relationship with Miss Ewell becomes more strained but he does make a bond with new teacher Miss Petting.

Miss Doris Ewell (Portrayed by Joan Sanderson). Nicknamed Doris "Rotten" Ewell or "Old Mother Ewell", she is Mr Cromwell's deputy and is rigorously strict and humourless, not just with the pupils but also the staff and as a result she is an unpopular - but feared - figure. Her icy demeanour initially only breaks when she is with the headteacher to whom she is devoted but later on she strikes up a romantic relationship with careers teacher Mr Sibley who is capable of getting her to relax her strict standards. In Series 4 in particular - possibly linked to her new relationship - Miss Ewell becomes more critical of the Head, becoming increasingly frustrated with his incompetence, limited work ethic and immature behaviour. Just before the final episode she marries Mr Sibley off-screen.   

Mr Smith (Portrayed by Erik Chitty). Mr Smith's unusual first name of "Osborne" reflects his rather quaint and old-fashioned personality although he is more commonly called "Smithy" by staff and pupils. He teaches Geography and - rather incongruously given his advancing years - P.E.. An affable man he is occasionally drawn into childish spats with the Headteacher. He is utterly devoted to his wife Madge & often talks about her, even bringing her picture to school which he brings out when he has the lunch she has prepared. Similar to Potter's wife Ruby she is a character much discussed but very rarely seen on screen.

Mr Vaughan Price (Portrayed by Richard Davies). A science and maths teacher nicknamed "Pricey" by staff and pupils, any enthusiasm for teaching he once had had long since disappeared. His personality swings between sarcastic and subversive humour (often with a poetic turn of phrase) to fury, particularly when antagonised by pupils. The only things that seem to enthuse Mr Price are alcohol, women (unrequited) and pride in his Welsh identity.

Mr Gregory Dix (Portrayed by Glynn Edwards). He appears for two episodes in Series 4. A former army physical training instructor he is aggressive and bullying in his manner, showing contempt towards pupils and other staff - especially Potter. He unites pupils and staff against him although the weak Head is reluctant to challenge him.

Mr David Ffitchett-Brown (Portrayed by Richard Warwick). Ffitchett-Brown arrives early in Series 4. He is a very posh former army officer but despite his traditional background he is a flashy dresser, drives a sports car and has liberal and progressive views on education. He has a strong sense of humour and a fearless streak - he is the only member of staff confident enough to confront Mr Dix.

Mr John Hurst (Portrayed by Bernard Holley). Mr Hurst arrives almost half-way through Series 4 - he used to teach at Weaver Street which has just been closed down leading to an influx of its former pupils at Fenn Street. He has a good sense of humour and a mild cynicism but without the more noted eccentricities of other staff.

Miss Gloria Petting (Portrayed by Vivienne Martin). Miss Petting arrives at the same time as Mr Hurst but unlike him she has no experience of teaching secondary school pupils - indeed her only experience has been teaching at nursery school and she tries to use the same techniques at Fenn Street. Although she is good-natured and dedicated she is completely out of her depth and is often left upset by 5C. Her rather innocent nature does though help her make a connection with the similarly naive Mr Cromwell who also likes her desire to please after Miss Ewell drifts away from him.

Pupils

Eric Duffy (Portrayed by Peter Cleall). Eric is the undisputed leader of the pupils. He has a tough demeanour and although - in common with almost all the pupils - he displays little enthusiasm for school he generally does the right thing and is always fair-minded.

Peter Craven (Portrayed by Malcolm McFee) Nicknamed "Cottage", Craven is known for his sharp dress-sense and wise-cracking and after Duffy he is the most influential of the boys.

Dennis Dunstable (Portrayed by Peter Denyer) Dennis has learning difficulties and his misunderstandings are sometimes the source of humour but he always impresses with his good intentions and positivity and therefore is popular with just about everyone in the school (Potter being an occasional exception). In one of the ways in which the show occasionally touched on more serious themes Dennis often talks about the cruelty of his father towards him and his mother and staff and pupils are united in their solidarity with him.

Frankie Abbott (Portrayed by David Barry) Abbott is a trouble-maker and fantasist who often tries to portray himself as tough and talented (e.g. that he is a private eye called "Hank Abbott") but is always exposed as inept and immature. He is regarded with derision by staff and his fellow pupils. He is embarrassed by his mother (played by Barbara Mitchell) who calls him "my little soldier" and makes all-too clear that he has a lot of growing-up to do. 

Sharon Eversleigh (Portrayed by Penny Spencer, and later portrayed by Carol Hawkins) Sharon dresses and acts in a flirtatious manner, often to the embarrassment of her teacher Mr Hedges but to the approval of the boys. She is well-versed in relationships, including with Duffy and Craven as well as the unseen "Vic".

Maureen Bullock (Portrayed by Liz Gebhardt) Maureen has two passions in life - her Catholic faith and her very public crush on Mr Hedges, which he does his best not to indulge but is never successful in deflecting her interest. She is generally one of the more dedicated pupils and often talks of her religious leader Monsignor Sopwith - another of the rarely seen (only one episode), much-discussed characters in the show. She is, though, capable of occasional protests and rebellious behaviour, often when she feels overlooked by Mr Hedges. She generally gets on well with Sharon but the two occasionally have their differences with Maureen regarding Sharon as sometimes crossing the line in her appearance and provocative demeanour.

Former Weaver Street pupils (Series 4 only)

Terry Stringer (Portrayed by Barry McCarthy) Stringer is the leader of the former Weaver Street pupils who arrive almost half-way through Series 4. He therefore has some similarities with Eric Duffy but without the latter's good-humour, wit and essential good-naturedness. Also unlike Eric he relies on another pupil (Gobber) to make sure the others follow his lead.

Gobber (Portrayed by Charles Bolton). His actual name is Robin Gibbon but he is almost always referred to as "Gobber". Like Dennis in the first three series Gobber has learning difficulties but unlike Dennis he is aggressive and intimidating, used by Terry Stringer as his "enforcer".

Des (Portrayed by Billy Hamon) Des is almost always seen with his guitar and often interrupts lessons by trying to break into song (often of a protest or blues style) but his attempts at music-making are tuneless, raucous and abysmal. He does seem to have rather more of a talent at football but even then his defiant nature brings him into difficulties.

Celia (Portrayed by Drina Pavlovic) and Daisy (portrayed by Rosemary Faith) are two friends but it is a rather one-sided friendship with Daisy doting on Celia. Daisy lacks confidence, particularly in her appearance, and makes a connection with the similarly-unconfident Miss Petting.

See also

 List of films based on British sitcoms
 Welcome Back, Kotter

References

External links

1960s British sitcoms
1960s British workplace comedy television series
1970s British sitcoms
1970s British workplace comedy television series
1968 British television series debuts
1972 British television series endings
English-language television shows
ITV sitcoms
Television series about educators
Television series by ITV Studios
London Weekend Television shows
British high school television series
Television shows adapted into films